Richard J. F. Chartier, is the current Chief Justice of Manitoba.

He was appointed a judge of the Manitoba Court of Appeal on November 23, 2006.  He replaced A. Kerr Twaddle, who elected to become a supernumerary judge.  He was appointed as Chief Justice of Manitoba on March 7, 2013.

Chartier received a Bachelor of Laws in 1982 from the Université de Moncton and Bachelor of Arts in 1979 from Collège Universitaire de Saint-Boniface and was admitted to the Bar of Manitoba in 1983. Before being appointed to the Provincial Court in 1993, he practised with the firm of Aikins MacAulay Thorvaldson in Winnipeg (from 1986 to 1993). As a lawyer, he developed an expertise in corporate and commercial law, banking law, real estate law, municipal law and tax law. His criminal law and family law expertise developed in the 13 years he served on the Provincial Court. Since becoming a judge, Chartier has been a member of the Provincial Court Management Committee, Chair of the Rules Committee of the Provincial Court and Chair of the Youth Front-End Administrative Model Subcommittee.

References

Government of Canada News Release (accessed July 31, 2007).
 (Reviewed June 8, 2017)

Judges in Manitoba
Université de Moncton alumni
Living people
Université de Moncton École de droit alumni
Year of birth missing (living people)